81st parallel may refer to:

81st parallel north, a circle of latitude in the Northern Hemisphere
81st parallel south, a circle of latitude in the Southern Hemisphere, in Antarctica